Indore Lok Sabha constituency is one of the 29 Lok Sabha constituencies in Madhya Pradesh state in central India. This constituency covers most of the Indore district.

The Member of Parliament from Indore Lok Sabha constituency is Shankar Lalwani. Since 1989, the seat is held by the BJP. Before Lalwani, the seat was held for record 8 consecutive terms by BJP's Sumitra Mahajan since 1989, who was also the Speaker of the Lok Sabha between 2014 and 2019.

Vidhan Sabha segments
Presently, Indore Lok Sabha constituency comprises the following eight Vidhan Sabha segments:

Members of Lok Sabha

Election Results

21st century

2019 Election

2014 Election

2009 Election

2004 Election

20th century

1999 Election

1998 Election

1996 Election

1991 Election

1989 Election

1984 Election

See also
 Indore district
 List of Constituencies of the Lok Sabha

References

Lok Sabha constituencies in Madhya Pradesh
Indore district